Vakhonkino is a rural locality (a village) in Nikolskoye Rural Settlement, Kaduysky District, Vologda Oblast, Russia. The population was 45 as of 2002.

Geography 
Vakhonkino is located 30 km north of Kaduy (the district's administrative centre) by road. Sloboda is the nearest rural locality.

References 

Rural localities in Kaduysky District